Svetonedeljski Breg is a settlement in the Town of Sveta Nedelja in Zagreb County, Croatia. According to the 2011 census, it had a population of 177 people.

References

Populated places in Zagreb County